Tezcan is a Turkish given name and surname. Notable people with the name include:

 Sabri Tezcan, Turkish Olympic fencer
 Şazi Tezcan (1907 – 1962), Turkish football referee
 Semih Tezcan (born 1932), Turkish scientist

Turkish-language surnames
Turkish masculine given names